Gil Blumstein (born 20 May 1990) is an Israeli professional footballer who plays for Hapoel Rishon LeZion. Blumstein plays as a forward and as an attacking midfielder. He also holds a Polish passport.

Playing career 
Blumstein signed his first professional contract with Maccabi Petah Tikva in July 2008, but he couldn't get minutes and he moved lately to Hapoel Be'er Sheva.

Blumstein made his debut for Hapoel Be'er Sheva in a league match against his former club, Maccabi Petah Tikva on 26 September 2009.

On 5 July 2010, Blumstein signed at Inverness. He made his debut against Celtic on 14 October 2010. He moved off the bench on 61st minute, but he injured and replaced 17 minutes later.
For the 2012–13 season He signed with Hapoel Ashkelon in Liga Leumit. He played at Ashkelon for two seasons.

At June 2014 moved to Hapoel Ra'anana. The next season, he returned to play in Liga Leumit, this time for Beitar Tel Aviv Ramla.

External links
Gil Blumstein profile in Walla! Sport website

1990 births
Living people
Israeli footballers
Jewish Israeli sportspeople
Beitar Nes Tubruk F.C. players
Maccabi Petah Tikva F.C. players
Hapoel Be'er Sheva F.C. players
Inverness Caledonian Thistle F.C. players
Hapoel Nir Ramat HaSharon F.C. players
Hapoel Ashkelon F.C. players
Hapoel Bnei Lod F.C. players
Hapoel Ra'anana A.F.C. players
Beitar Tel Aviv Bat Yam F.C. players
Hapoel Rishon LeZion F.C. players
Israeli Premier League players
Scottish Premier League players
Liga Leumit players
Israeli expatriate footballers
Expatriate footballers in Scotland
Israeli expatriate sportspeople in Scotland
Association football forwards
Israeli people of Polish-Jewish descent